Economist Party may refer to:

Economist Party (Peru)
Economist Party (Thailand)